Anton Mavretič (11 December 1934 in Metlika, Slovenia – 21 November 2019) was a Slovene electrical engineer who worked in the United States.

Mavretič was a professor and research associate at the Center for Space Physics at Boston University. He became a corresponding member of Slovenian Academy of Sciences and Arts in June 2007. In 1985 he founded the consulting firm SIAT of Boston LLC.

Mavretič worked for the MIT Center for Space Research under contract for NASA from 1972 to 1979 and contributed to the development of plasma spectrometers for the Voyager 1 and Voyager 2 projects.

Education 
 Bachelor of science in electrical engineering from the University of Denver, December, 1959
 Master of science in electrical engineering from the University of Denver, June, 1961
 PhD in electrical engineering from Pennsylvania State University, December, 1968

References

External links 
 http://www.bu.edu/dbin/csp/people.php?id=536
 http://www.freepatentsonline.com/4354562.html
 https://www.youtube.com/watch?v=qlE8N9tweS4

1934 births
2019 deaths
Slovenian electrical engineers
People from Metlika
Slovenian emigrants to the United States
Boston University faculty
Members of the Slovenian Academy of Sciences and Arts